Spencerville may refer to:


Places
Spencerville, Ontario, Canada
Spencerville, New Zealand

United States
Spencerville, Indiana
Spencerville, Maryland
Spencerville Adventist Academy, Maryland
Spencerville, New Mexico
Spencerville, Ohio
Spencerville, Oklahoma

Other uses
Spencerville (novel), by Nelson DeMille
Spencerville, the fictional location of children's television program Hallo Spencer

See also